Bijak is the best known of the compilations of the  Kabir, and as such is the holy scripture for followers of the Kabir panth sect. It also has a number of folk songs 

The Bijak is one of the earliest of the major texts in modern Bagheli. 
 Vipramatisi
 Kahara
 Basant
 Chachar
 Beli
 Birahuli
 Hindola
 Sakhi

References
 मूलबीजकटीकासहित, Khemraj Shrikrishnadas, 1995.
 The Bijak of Kabir,  by Linda Hess (Translator), Shukdev Singh (Translator), Oxford University Press, USA, 2002
 Kabir Jivan Katha by Sant Vivekdas Acharya, Kabir Bhavan, Mandangir, Pushpa Bhavan, New Delhi-110062
The Bijak of Kabir; translated into English

Hindi poetry collections